Steven Finn (born August 20, 1966) is a Canadian former professional ice hockey player who played 13 seasons in the National Hockey League from 1985–86 until 1996–97.  He is currently a junior hockey analyst for TVA Sports.

Playing career

A defenceman, Finn was drafted 57th overall by the Quebec Nordiques in the 1984 NHL Entry Draft. He played 725 career NHL games, scoring 34 goals and 78 assists for 112 points. During the 1990–91 season he served as Quebec Nordiques team co-captain with Joe Sakic.

Finn played most of his career with the Nordiques, but towards the end of his career split parts of three seasons with the Tampa Bay Lightning and Los Angeles Kings.

Career statistics

External links
 Steven Finn's NHL Salary History at HockeyZonePlus.com

1966 births
Living people
Anglophone Quebec people
Canadian ice hockey defencemen
Fredericton Express players
Laval Titan players
Laval Voisins players
Sportspeople from Laval, Quebec
Los Angeles Kings players
Quebec Nordiques draft picks
Quebec Nordiques players
Tampa Bay Lightning players
Ice hockey people from Quebec
20th-century Canadian people
21st-century Canadian people